Burundi competed at the 2000 Summer Olympics in Sydney, Australia.

Athletics 

Key
 Note – Ranks given for track events are within the athlete's heat only
 Q = Qualified for the next round
 q = Qualified for the next round as a fastest loser or, in field events, by position without achieving the qualifying target
 NR = National record
 N/A = Round not applicable for the event
 Bye = Athlete not required to compete in round

Men

Women

References
Official Olympic Reports

Nations at the 2000 Summer Olympics
2000
O